Clostridium acetireducens  is a Gram-positive, rod-shaped, anaerobic and non-motile bacterium from the genus of Clostridium which has been isolated from an anaerobic bioreactor from De Krim in the Netherlands.

References

 

Bacteria described in 1996
acetireducens